Anthony Julian Thomas Chilton (born 7 September 1965) is an English former professional footballer who played as a defender.

References

1965 births
Living people
English footballers
Association football defenders
Burnley F.C. players
Whitby Town F.C. players
Hartlepool United F.C. players
Whitley Bay F.C. players
Barrow A.F.C. players
Workington A.F.C. players
Gretna F.C. players
Newcastle Blue Star F.C. players
Altrincham F.C. players
Gateshead F.C. players
English Football League players
Sunderland A.F.C. players
People from Maryport
Footballers from Cumbria